2009–10 was the 11th season that Division 1 functioned as the third-level of ice hockey in Sweden, below the second-level HockeyAllsvenskan and the top-level Elitserien (now the SHL).

Format 
The 58 participating teams played the first half of the season in six groups divided geographically. The successful teams then moved into three new groups (the Allettan groups), while the remaining teams played in a continuation of their smaller existing groups. The teams with the worst records in these continuation groups were then forced to defend their places in Division 1 against challengers from Division 2 (see "relegation tournament" below) in a round-robin tournament called Kvalserien till Division 1. Meanwhile, the successful teams from the Allettan groups along with the group winners of the continuation groups played a playoff to determine who would have a chance to compete for promotion to the second-tier league HockeyAllsvenskan in Kvalserien till HockeyAllsvenskan.

First round

Division 1A

Division 1B

Division 1C

Division 1D

Division 1E

Division 1F

AllEttan

Northern Group (A/B)

Central Group (C/D)

Southern Group (E/F)

Qualification round

Division 1A

Division 1B

Division 1C

Division 1D

Division 1E

Division 1F

Playoffs

First round 
 Bodens HC - Hudiksvalls HC 0:2 (1:2, 2:3) 
 Sollefteå HK - Piteå HC 0:2 (1:5, 2:7) 
 Valbo HC - IFK Arboga 0:2 (1:4, 1:4) 
 Visby-Roma HK - Nyköpings HK 0:2 (1:2, 3:4 OT) 
 Tranås AIF - Olofströms IK 0:2 (4:7, 3:5) 
 Karlskrona HK - Nybro IF 1:2 (3:2, 0:6, 2:4)

Second round 
 Piteå HC - Asplöven HC 1:2 (6:3, 0:4, 2:3) 
 Hudiksvalls HC - HC Vita Hästen 0:2 (1:10, 3:4 SO) 
 Nybro IF - IFK Arboga 2:0 (6:1, 2:0) 
 Nyköpings HK - Olofströms IK 0:2 (3:4, 1:6)

Final 
 Asplöven HC - Enköpings HK 1:2 (5:3, 1:5, 1:3) 
 HC Vita Hästen - Tingsryds AIF 1:2 (2:1, 1:7, 4:5 OT) 
 Nybro IF - Kiruna IF 2:0 (11:0, 4:0) 
 Olofströms IK - Huddinge IK 2:0 (5:2, 5:4)

Relegation

Division 1A

Division 1B

Division 1C

Division 1D

Division 1E

Division 1F

External links 
 Season on hockeyarchives.info

3
Swedish Division I seasons